The Education Authority is a non-departmental body sponsored by the Department of Education in Northern Ireland. It was established under the Education Act (Northern Ireland) 2014 (c. 12) which was passed by the Northern Ireland Assembly. The authority became operational on 1 April 2015.

Responsibilities 
The Education Authority is responsible for ensuring that efficient and effective primary and secondary education services are available to meet the needs of children and young people, and support for the provision of efficient and effective youth services. These services were previously delivered by the five Education and Library Boards (ELBs). Each of the former ELBs is now a sub region of the Education Authority:
 Belfast Region
 North Eastern Region
 South Eastern Region
 Southern Region
 Western Region

Education Authority Board 
The Education Authority Board consists of 20 members plus the Chair. These include:
 8 political members who were nominated by political parties according to the D’Hondt mechanism;
 4 members representative of the interests of the Transferors (the Church of Ireland, the Methodist Church in Ireland, and the Presbyterian Church in Ireland) of controlled schools;
 4 members representative of the interests of the Trustees of maintained schools;
 1 member representative of the interests of Integrated schools;
 1 member representative of the interests of Irish medium schools;
 1 member representative of the interests of Voluntary Grammar schools; and
 1 member representative of the interests of Controlled Grammar schools

References

External links 
 Education Authority 

Education in Northern Ireland
Education administration in Northern Ireland